General elections were held in Mexico in 1861. Although incumbent president Benito Juárez received a majority (53%) of the popular vote, opponents claimed his margin of victory was not enough and a Congressional vote was required. The Congressional election committee released two reports, one produced by the majority declaring Juárez the winner, and one stating that there should be a Congressional vote between Juárez and runner-up Sebastián Lerdo de Tejada. The majority report was approved by a vote of 61–55, and Juárez was subsequently inaugurated on 15 June.

Results

President

References

Mexico
General
Presidential elections in Mexico
Election and referendum articles with incomplete results